Carlos Rafael Vega Mena is a Chilean football manager and former footballer who played as a forward for clubs in Chile and abroad.

Club career
Vega played football for thirteen years for clubs in his homeland, Switzerland, Mexico, Colombia, Indonesia and Australia.

After his stints in Switzerland, Magallanes, with whom he won the league title of the Chilean Tercera División in 1995 scoring two goals in the final match, and the Mexican side Correcaminos UAT, he joined Colo-Colo in 1997. After having no chances to play in the league, he was loaned to Deportes Puerto Montt.

The next season, he played for Colombian side Deportes Tolima and returned to Chile in 1999 to play for O'Higgins, coinciding again with Sergio Villegas, with whom had played in Colo-Colo and Deportes Puerto Montt.

In 2001, he moved abroad again and played for Indonesian side Persema Malang, later Malang United, where he coincided with his compatriot Jimmy Rojas.

His last club was Sorrento FC in the National Premier Leagues Western Australia in 2004.

Coaching career
In 2003, he attended  (National Football Institute) in his homeland and graduated as a football manager, starting to coach in 2004 when he came to Australia.

Coaching both male and female Juniors and Seniors, he has worked for Sorrento FC, Chile Nuevo, Ellenbrook United and Perth Saints before coaching Northern Redbacks at both youth and senior level from 2019 to 2021.

In 2021, he joined Perth RedStar.

Personal life
In Australia, he also worked as a individual trader until 2019.

His daughter, Natalia, has played football for both Perth Saints Boys U13 and Northern Redbacks U16.

References

External links
 
 Carlos Vega Mena Interview at Northern Redbacks Womens Soccer Club on Facebook

Living people
Chilean footballers
Chilean expatriate footballers
Deportes Magallanes footballers
Magallanes footballers
Correcaminos UAT footballers
Colo-Colo footballers
Puerto Montt footballers
Deportes Tolima footballers
O'Higgins F.C. footballers
Persema Malang players
Sorrento FC players
Tercera División de Chile players
Ascenso MX players
Chilean Primera División players
Categoría Primera A players
Indonesian Premier Division players
Chilean expatriate sportspeople in Switzerland
Chilean expatriate sportspeople in Mexico
Chilean expatriate sportspeople in Colombia
Chilean expatriate sportspeople in Indonesia
Chilean expatriate sportspeople in Australia
Expatriate footballers in Switzerland
Expatriate footballers in Mexico
Expatriate footballers in Colombia
Expatriate footballers in Indonesia
Expatriate soccer players in Australia
Association football forwards
Chilean football managers
Chilean expatriate football managers
Expatriate soccer managers in Australia
Date of birth missing (living people)
Place of birth missing (living people)
Year of birth missing (living people)